戀愛情色 (Colors of Love) is the third Cantonese Greatest Hits Album by Hong Kong singer Kelly Chen.It was released on December 8, 1999 through Go East Entertainment Company Ltd./ Decca Records in Hong Kong and Taiwan.  which peaked at number 1 for 3 weeks, stayed on the IFPI Album Chart for 14 weeks, and sold over 150,000 copies in Hong Kong.

In 2000, Chen won IFPI's best-selling album award and the best-selling Hong Kong female artist.

The compilation includes Kelly's hits from some of her studio albums which was released in 1998-1999. It also featured 8 new songs: Three original songs, "Colors of Love (戀愛情色)", "False Innocence(假天真)" and "Love Is All Around (渾身是愛)"; two cover songs "The Root of Love (愛的根源)" and "Childhood (99 Version)(小時候(99年版)"; four remakes of her previous singles— "I Dare to Love (Autumn Version) (我敢去愛 (Autumn Version))" (1999), "I Can't Help But Love You (情不自禁 (Acoustic Version))" (1999), "It's All Your Fault (Duet Version) (都是你的錯 (合唱版))" (1999) and "I Care About You So Much (Piano Version) (對你太在乎 (Piano Version))" (1999).

Track listing

Release history

References

Kelly Chen albums
1999 albums